Tubreh Riz (also Romanized as Tūbreh Rīz; also known as Tarburīz, Tōrbeh Rīz, Torbrīz, and Tūrbeh Rīz) is a village in Howmeh-ye Dehgolan Rural District, in the Central District of Dehgolan County, Kurdistan Province, Iran. At the 2006 census, its population was 336, in 73 families. The village is populated by Kurds.

References 

Towns and villages in Dehgolan County
Kurdish settlements in Kurdistan Province